A list of films produced by the Bollywood film industry based in Mumbai in 1959:

Highest-grossing films
The ten highest-grossing films at the Indian Box Office in 1959:

A-D

E-M

N-Z

References

External links
 Bollywood films of 1959 at the Internet Movie Database
 Indian Film Songs from the Year 1959 - A look back at the year 1959 with a special focus on Hindi film songs

|}

1959
Bollywood
Films, Bollywood